Amathina  is a genus of small sea snails, marine heterobranch gastropod molluscs or micromolluscs in the family Amathinidae.

Amathina is the type genus of the family Amathinidae.

Species 
Species within the genus Amathina include:
 Amathina bicarinata Pease, 1861
 Amathina oyamai Masuda & H. Noda, 1976
 Amathina tricarinata (Linnaeus, 1767)
Species brought into synonymy
 Amathina angustata Souverbie, 1875: synonym of Amathina tricarinata (Linnaeus, 1767)
 Amathina imbricata G. B. Sowerby III, 1889: synonym of Hipponicidae incertae sedis imbricata G. B. Sowerby III, 1889 (not Amathina, but rather Hipponicidae)
 Amathina nobilis A. Adams, 1867: synonym of Trichamathina nobilis (A. Adams, 1867)
 Amathina tricostata (Gmelin, 1790): synonym of Amathina tricarinata (Linnaeus, 1767)
 Amathina trigona G. B. Sowerby II, 1870: synonym of Amathina bicarinata Pease, 1861
 Amathina violacea (Angas, 1867): synonym of Capulus violaceus Angas, 1867
 Amathina violaceus (Angas, 1867): synonym of Amathina violacea (Angas, 1867): synonym of Capulus violaceus Angas, 1867 (incorrect gender ending)

References

External links
 Neave, Sheffield Airey. (1939-1996). Nomenclator Zoologicus vol. 1-10 

Amathinidae
Gastropod genera